Ebenezer Peck (May 22, 1805 – May 25, 1881) was an attorney and politician in the United States and Lower Canada and a judge of the Court of Claims.

Education and career
Born on May 22, 1805, in Portland, District of Maine (then part of Massachusetts), Peck read law in Montreal, Lower Canada (now Quebec), British America in 1827. He entered private practice in Stanstead and Sherbrooke, Lower Canada from 1827 to 1833. He was King's counsel for Lower Canada in 1833. He was a member of the Legislative Assembly of Lower Canada from 1829 to 1835. He moved to Illinois in 1835. He was an internal improvement commissioner for Chicago, Illinois in 1837. He was a member of the Illinois Senate from 1838 to 1839. He was a member of the Illinois House of Representatives from 1840 to 1842, and from 1858 to 1860. He was a member of the Democratic Party until 1853, but his anti-slavery views led him to leave that party in 1853, and by 1856, he was assisting in establishing the Republican Party in Illinois. He was clerk for the Illinois Supreme Court from 1841 to 1848. He was in private practice in Chicago from 1846 to 1863. He was publisher and editor of The Argus in Chicago in 1850. He was reporter for the Illinois Supreme Court from 1849 to 1863.

Federal judicial service
Peck was nominated by President Abraham Lincoln on March 6, 1863, to the Court of Claims (later the United States Court of Claims), to a new seat authorized by 12 Stat. 765. He was confirmed by the United States Senate on March 10, 1863, and received his commission the same day. His service terminated on May 1, 1878, due to his resignation.

Death
Peck died on May 25, 1881, in Chicago.

References

Sources
 
 

1805 births
1881 deaths
Politicians from Portland, Maine
Lawyers from Chicago
Lawyers in Quebec
Editors of Illinois newspapers
Members of the Legislative Assembly of Lower Canada
Illinois state senators
Members of the Illinois House of Representatives
Illinois Democrats
Illinois Republicans
Judges of the United States Court of Claims
United States Article I federal judges appointed by Abraham Lincoln
19th-century American judges
19th-century American politicians